Gan is a railway station in Gan, Nouvelle-Aquitaine, France. The station is located on the Pau–Canfranc railway. The station is served by TER (local) services operated by the SNCF.

Train services
The following services currently call at Gan:
local service (TER Nouvelle-Aquitaine) Pau - Oloron-Sainte-Marie - Bedous

References

Railway stations in Pyrénées-Atlantiques